Nino Uchadze (born 10 July 1965 in Kutaisi) is a Georgian sport shooter. She competed in shooting events at the 1996 and 2000 Summer Olympics.

Olympic results

References

1965 births
Living people
Female sport shooters from Georgia (country)
Olympic shooters of Georgia (country)
Shooters at the 1996 Summer Olympics
Shooters at the 2000 Summer Olympics
People from Kutaisi